José Félix Quirós (1811, San Miguel, El Salvador – 1883, San Miguel) was President of El Salvador 3–7 February 1848 and 1 March - 3 May 1851.

He served as Vice President of Doroteo Vasconcelos from February 1848 to April 1851, and Vice President of Gerardo Barrios from February 1860 to October 1863.

References

Presidents of El Salvador
Vice presidents of El Salvador
1811 births
1883 deaths
19th-century Salvadoran people